IMDG may refer to:
 International Maritime Dangerous Goods Code
 In-memory data grid, such as Hazelcast
 An imidazol molecule